Robert Ignacy Gliński (born 17 April 1952 in Warsaw) is a Polish film director and screenwriter. A graduate of the National Film School in Łódź.  He won the  Golden Lions at the Gdynia Film Festival in 1992 with his film  Wszystko, co najważniejsze and in 2001 with Cześć, Tereska. In 2002 he received an Eagle, the Polish Film Award for his film Cześć, Tereska.

Robert Gliński served as the Rector of the National Film School in Łódź from 2008 to 2012. He is the brother of Piotr Gliński.

Selected filmography
 2017: Misery
 2014: Kamienie na szaniec (Stones For the Rampart)
 2009: Świnki (Piggies)
 2005: The Call of the Toad
 2001: Cześć Tereska (Hi, Tereska)
 1997: Kochaj i rób co chcesz (Love Me and Do Whatever You Want)
 1996: Matka swojej matki (Mother of Her Own Mother)
 1992: Wszystko, co najważniejsze (All That Really Matters)
 1983: Niedzielne igraszki (Sunday Pranks'')

References

External links
 
 Robert Gliński at the Culture.pl
 Robert Gliński at the Filmpolski Database 

1952 births
Living people
Film people from Warsaw
Polish film directors
Polish screenwriters